Andrew Graham Cameron MBE (born 13 October 1940) is a Scottish comedian, television and radio broadcaster.

Early life
He was born in London while his father, Hugh Cameron, was serving in the Army during World War II. Cameron was raised by his grandmother, Isabella 'Bella' Cameron, in the Royal Burgh of Rutherglen, south-east of Glasgow, Scotland. Prior to pursuing this career he had worked for a time with the Glasgow-based structural engineering firm, Sir William Arrol & Co. and for Glasgow Corporation Transport.

Comedy career
He entered show business when he was 32, initially working in clubs. His act as a football hooligan led to him becoming a top comedy act in Scottish football clubs. He is probably best known for writing and performing the football anthem "Ally's Tartan Army" for the Scotland national football team's appearance at the 1978 World Cup. It went to #6 in the UK Singles Chart and led to two appearances on Top of the Pops in 1978. Cameron promptly put all of the profits from his single into producing an album, which he hoped to release while the World Cup fever in Scotland was still going strong. He was too late - Scotland team went out of the World Cup early and Cameron's album fared equally badly. Andy also released a song in the 70's for his beloved Glasgow Rangers - 'The Greatest Team of All' - which still appears on the odd Rangers compilation album.

In 1975 he came second in New Faces leading to several appearances on variety shows such as Live at Her Majesty’s with Jimmy Tarbuck and Tarby and Friends.

In 1979, soon after the establishment of BBC Radio Scotland, he was given a thirteen-week contract to present a programme of music and humour. The show eventually ran for fifteen years. He was voted Radio Personality of the year in 1984. He had his own series on BBC Scotland in 1979 and again in 1982. He was awarded Scottish Television Personality of the Year for his 1983 series called It’s Andy Cameron.

In the early 1980s he was invited to speak in debates at Cambridge and Oxford Universities alongside Arnold Brown and James Naughtie.

In 1984, Cameron presented STV's Hogmanay show. The following year he presented the BBC Scotland Hogmanay show, and continued to do so until 1989. His last Hogmanay appearance was in 1990, in a short programme called Andy's Scottish Filling which preceded the live BBC Hogmanay Show.

In 1994 Cameron joined the cast of Take the High Road, the STV soap. He played a character called Chic Cherry, until the last episode in 2003.

Rangers FC
Cameron is a well-known celebrity supporter of Rangers F.C. In the early 1980s he caused some controversy by attacking the club's anti-catholic signing policies at an Annual General Meeting of the club. He has a 'stand-up' act before Rangers' home league matches. In 1999, a follower of rival club Aberdeen F.C. ran from the away section at Ibrox Stadium to assault Cameron as he performed a routine on the pitch prior to kick-off – the assailant was banned by the club and fined at court.

Current activity
He currently works as an after dinner speaker. Furthermore, he presented a show on Clyde 2 on Sunday afternoons until that show ended in late 2009 when he was replaced by Tom Ferrie, whose show is now networked by two or three others Scottish radio stations.

Honours
Cameron was appointed Member of the Order of the British Empire (MBE) in the 2015 New Year Honours for services to entertainment and charity in Glasgow.

References

External links
Profile, at Speak Out, a division of TMC Corporate Events & Entertainment Ltd

Living people
1940 births
People from Rutherglen
People educated at Rutherglen Academy
Scottish radio personalities
Scottish songwriters
Scottish stand-up comedians
Scottish male television actors
Scottish television presenters
People from Thorntonhall
Members of the Order of the British Empire
20th-century Scottish male singers
Scottish male soap opera actors